Lorentz Fisker may refer to:

 Lorentz Henrik Fisker (1753–1819) Danish admiral and oceanographer, awardee of the Grand Cross of the Order of the Dannebrog
 Henrik Lorentz Fisker (1720–1797) Danish admiral
  (1684–1757), Danish, amtsforvalter county officer for Nysted and byfoged county officer for Copenhagen
  (1731–1779), Norwegian, lagmann county officer for Christiansand og Agdesidens